Peter Kowald (21 April 1944 – 21 September 2002) was a German free jazz and  free improvising double bassist and tubist.

Career
A member of the Globe Unity Orchestra, and a touring double-bass player, Kowald collaborated with many European free jazz and American free-jazz players during his career, including Peter Brötzmann, Irène Schweizer, Karl Berger, Fred Anderson, Hamid Drake, Karl E. H. Seigfried, Conny Bauer, Jeffrey Morgan, Wadada Leo Smith, Günter Sommer, William Parker, Barre Phillips, Joëlle Léandre, Alfred Harth, Lauren Newton and Evan Parker. He also recorded a number of solo double-bass albums, and was a member of the London Jazz Composer's Orchestra until 1985. He also recorded a number of pioneering double bass duets with Maarten Altena, Barry Guy, Joëlle Léandre, Barre Phillips, William Parker, Damon Smith and Peter Jacquemyn.

In addition, Kowald collaborated extensively with poets and artists and with the dancers Gerlinde Lambeck, Anne Martin (formerly of Pina Bausch Ensemble), Tadashi Endo, Patricia Parker (founder of the Vision Festival), Maria Mitchell, Sally Silvers, Cheryl Banks (formerly of Sun Ra's Arkestra), Arnette de Mille, Sayonara Pereira, and Kazuo Ohno. Specific works included Die Klage der Kaiserin (1989) with Pina Bausch, short pieces (since 1989) with Jean Sasportes, The spirit of adventure (1990) with Anastasia Lyra, Wasser in der Hand (1990/91) with Christine Brunel, and Futan no sentaku/The burden of choice (1990/91) with Min Tanaka and Butch Morris.

Besides his duo work with singers such as Jeanne Lee, Diamanda Galás, Anna Homler or Sainkho Namtchylak, Peter was especially interested in his international improvising ensemble Global Village with musicians from different cultural regions of the world: China, Japan, Near East, South Europe, North and South America.

He died of a heart attack in New York City in 2002.

Discography

As leader or co-leader
Die Jungen: Random Generators (FMP, 1979) with Barre Phillips
Touch the Earth (FMP, 1980) with Leo Smith and Günter Sommer
Two Making a Triangle (FMP, 1982) with Maarten Altena
If You Want the Kernels You Have to Break the Shells (FMP, 1982) with Leo Smith and Günter Sommer
Paintings (FMP, 1982) with Barry Guy
Open Secrets (FMP, 1988)
Duos: Europa · America · Japan (FMP, 1984–89)
Duos 2 (FMP, 1986–90)
When The Sun Is Out You Don't See Stars (FMP, 1992) with Werner Lüdi, Butch Morris and Sainkho Namtchylak 
Was Da Ist (FMP, 1994)
Cuts (FMP, 1995) with Ort Ensemble Wuppertal, Evan Parker, Lê Quan Ninh and Carlos Zingaro
Bass Duets (FMP, 1979–82) – compilation
Mirror – Broken But no Dust (Balance Point Acoustics, 2000)
Deep Music (Free Elephant)
The Victoriaville Tape (Free Elephant)
Silence & Flies: Live at Nigglmuhle (Free Elephant, 2001)
 Between Heaven and Earth (Intakt, 2003) with Conrad Bauer and Günter Sommer
Global Village (Free Elephant, 2004)
Aria (Free Elephant, 2005)
Live at Kassiopeia (NoBusiness, 2011) with Julius Hemphill

As sideman
1966: Alexander Schlippenbach: Globe Unity
1967: Peter Brotzmann: For Adolphe Sax
1968: The Peter Brotzmann Octet: Machine Gun
1973: Globe Unity Orchestra – Live in Wuppertal
1986: Global Village Suite
1986: Wadada Leo Smith: Human Rights
1987: Bill Dixon: Thoughts (Soul Note)
1996/2003: Duos 1 / Duos 2
1998: Fred Anderson Trio – Live at the Velvet Lounge
2001: Peter Brotzmann – Fuck de Boere (recorded in 1968 and 1970)

References

External links 
Kowald's FMP releases
Biography and discography

Avant-garde jazz musicians
1944 births
2002 deaths
German jazz double-bassists
Male double-bassists
CIMP artists
20th-century double-bassists
20th-century German male musicians
German male jazz musicians
Spontaneous Music Ensemble members
Globe Unity Orchestra members
FMP/Free Music Production artists
Intakt Records artists
20th-century German musicians
NoBusiness Records artists
Locust Music artists